A pink peppercorn (French: baie rose, "pink berry") is a dried berry referring to three different species; the traditional Baies rose plant Euonymus phellomanus, the shrub Schinus molle, commonly known as the Peruvian peppertree, and the Schinus terebinthifolia (the Brazilian pepper).

The pink peppercorn from the Baies rose plant (Euonymus phellomanus), is usually imported from Madagascar. As a result, they are expensive. Pink peppercorns are pungent and slightly sweet, but not nearly as flavorful as the true pepper. These berries were once banned by the Food and Drug Administration as a foodstuff, but are now considered safe for consumption. This seed is not to be confused with the Brazilian pepper berry (pink berry).

Although not related to commercial pepper (Piper nigrum) the pink/red berries of the Peruvian peppertree (Schinus molle), are sold as pink peppercorns and often blended with commercial pepper. Pink peppercorns came to be called such because they resemble peppercorns, and because they, too, have a peppery flavor.  As they are members of the cashew family, they may cause allergic reactions including anaphylaxis for people with a tree nut allergy.

Dried berries from the related species Schinus terebinthifolia (the Brazilian pepper), are sometimes also called pink peppercorns (baies roses de Bourbon) and are used as a culinary spice. The Brazilian pepper was introduced as an ornamental plant to Florida by at latest 1891, probably earlier, where it has spread rapidly since about 1940, and eventually became invasive in the area where it is often referred to as "Florida Holly".

In 1982, the Food and Drug Administration (FDA) banned the import of Brazilian peppercorns from France into the United States, asserting that people who eat the berries risk an array of acute symptoms, such as swollen eyelids and indigestion, similar to poison ivy. In response, the Government of France maintained that the berries are safe to eat if grown in prescribed conditions. The United States later lifted the ban. The fruit and leaves of Peruvian pepper are potentially poisonous to poultry, pigs and possibly calves. Records also exist of young children who have experienced vomiting and diarrhea after eating the fruit. Presently both species of the Schinus pink peppercorn lack "generally recognized as safe" (GRAS) status with the FDA.

See also

 List of dried foods

References

Dried fruit
Peppers
Spices